was a daimyō and official of the Tokugawa shogunate during late-Edo period Japan. His courtesy title was Kawachi-no-kami.

Biography
Inoue Masaharu was the eldest son of the disgraced former daimyō of Hamamatsu, Inoue Masamoto, who had been demoted to Tanagura Domain in Mutsu Province.  He inherited the leadership of the Inoue clan and the position of daimyō of Tanakura Domain on his father's death in 1820.

In 1820, Masaharu was also appointed to the office of Sōshaban (Master of Ceremonies), and in 1834 to that of Jisha-bugyō. In 1836, he was transferred to Tatebayashi Domain (60,000 koku) in Kōzuke Province. In 1838, he was appointed Osaka jōdai (Castellan of Osaka) and in 1840, ascended to the rank of  Rōjū (Senior Councilor) in the service of Shōgun Tokugawa Ieyoshi.
 
In 1845, with the resignation of head Rōjū Mizuno Tadakuni over the failure of the Tenpō Reforms and subsequent exile from Hamamatsu Domain to Yamagata Domain in Dewa Province, Inoue Masaharu was able to achieve the Inoue clan's goal of returning to Hamamatsu after an absence of 28 years.
From his years in Tanakura in Mutsu, Masaharu brought back with him a considerable body of knowledge on cotton production as well as artisans to build new looms, thus developing a major new industry for Hamamatsu and source of income for the domain. He died in 1847, only two years after the return of the clan to Hamamatsu, and his grave is at the clan temple of Jōshin-ji in Mukogaoka, Bunkyō, Tokyo

Masaharu was married to a daughter of Abe Masakiyo, daimyō of Fukuyama Domain. He was succeeded by his fourth son Inoue Masanao. One of his daughters was the formal wife of Mizuno Tadakiyo, the son and heir of Mizuno Tadakuno.

References 
 Papinot, Edmond. (1906) Dictionnaire d'histoire et de géographie du japon. Tokyo: Librarie Sansaisha...Click link for digitized 1906 Nobiliaire du japon (2003)
 The content of much of this article was derived from that of the corresponding article on Japanese Wikipedia.

|-

|-

|-

Fudai daimyo
1805 births
1847 deaths
Osaka jōdai
Rōjū